Yasmin Mikila Neal (born February 10, 1985) is an American politician who has served in the Georgia House of Representatives from the 79th district since 2023. She previously served in the Georgia House of Representatives from the 75th district from 2011 to 2013, and from the 74th district through 2023.

References

1985 births
Living people
Democratic Party members of the Georgia House of Representatives
21st-century American women politicians
People from Jonesboro, Georgia
Women state legislators in Georgia (U.S. state)
21st-century American politicians